Bangladesh Athletics Federation is the national federation for athletics and is responsible for governing the sport in Bangladesh. Abdur Rokib Mantu is the General Secretary of the Bangladesh Athletics Federation. A.S. M Ali Kabir. is the President of the Federation.

History
Bangladesh Athletics Federation was established in 1972 after the independence of Bangladesh by the Sheikh Mujibur Rahman cabinet. The Federation holds practices at the Bangabandhu National Stadium. The tracks on the stadium were damaged and in 2020, events were held in Chittagong due to the damage at Bangabandhu National Stadium.

References

Athletics in Bangladesh
National members of the Asian Athletics Association
1972 establishments in Bangladesh
Sports organizations established in 1972
Athletics
Organisations based in Dhaka